Ballot Measure 5 was a landmark piece of direct legislation in the U.S. state of Oregon in 1990. Measure 5, an amendment to the Oregon Constitution (Article XI, Section 11), established limits on Oregon's property taxes on real estate.  Its primary champion and spokesman was Don McIntire, a politically-active Gresham health club owner who would go on to lead the Taxpayers Association of Oregon.

Property taxes dedicated for school funding were capped at $15 per $1,000 of real market value per year and gradually lowered to $5 per $1,000 per year. Property taxes for other purposes were capped at $10 per $1,000 per year. Thus, the total property tax rate would be 1.5% at the end of the five-year phase in period. The measure transferred the responsibility for school funding from local government to the state, to equalize funding.

The measure was passed in the November 6, 1990 general election with 574,833 votes in favor, 522,022 votes against. It was one of the most contentious measures in Oregon election history.

Historical significance 
Although measure numbers are reused, the effect of this measure on the state was significant enough that when Oregonians speak of Measure 5, they are usually referring to the specific measure passed in 1990. Measure 5 is often seen as the beginning of the Oregon tax revolt. One effect of the measure was that funding for local schools was shifted from primarily local property tax funds to state funds. With this, it led to a general equalization of funding between districts as funds are now given to districts based on the number of students in each district. Schools with higher value property in their districts previously could fund local schools at a higher rate than more economically depressed areas.

Passage of the measure and the limits led to some discussion of eliminating county services in Multnomah County by combining them with Portland city services or Metro, as well as talks of combining Multnomah, Washington, and Clackamas counties into one large urban county for the Portland metro area.

Lasting effects and subsequent legislation 
The measure has remained controversial since its passage. Oregon remains one of only five states without a sales tax, the others being Alaska, Delaware, Montana, and New Hampshire. Furthermore, the measure is blamed for cuts in school programs, the budget crises of 2002 and 2003 and cuts to statewide public safety programs, including deep cuts to the Oregon State Police which never fully recovered from 50% staffing reductions. Many critics say that then-Governor Barbara Roberts' warning that Measure 5's passage would lead to massive chaos has been borne out. Supporters defend the measure as necessary to curb government spending excesses.

Measure 5 was followed up with Measure 47 in 1996 and Measure 50 in 1997. Measure 47 limited the growth of a property's assessed value to 3% maximum per year to combat local governments' raising assessed values to make up the difference in the rate they could charge. Measure 50 clarified that measure.

References

External links
Oregon Initiatives, Referenda and Recalls, 1988-1995
 
The Oregon Constitution
Oregon Taxpayers Union

Initiatives in the United States
1990 Oregon ballot measures